Adedibu is a surname. Notable people with the surname include:

Kamorudeen Adekunle Adedibu, Nigerian politician
Lamidi Adedibu (1927–2008), Nigerian politician

Surnames of Nigerian origin